Yeshiva World News (YWN) is an Orthodox Jewish online news publication. It also has multiple services catering to Jews all over the world.

History
Yeshiva World News started in 2003 as a news aggregation blog by its founder Yehudah Eckstein. It has since grown to an independent news source with freelance reporters and photographers, in addition to continuing as a news aggregator. It is known for presenting news of interest to the Orthodox Jewish community. Its web page header says "Frum Jewish News" (frum is the Yiddish term for a religiously observant Jew). It is infamous for posting animated  headlines and click-bait advertisements.

The website was redesigned in 2010, and again in 2017. It has sections containing general news items and Israeli news, as well as religious news, and news tailored around Jewish life cycle events and the Jewish calendar. Many features are relevant to Jewish observance, including articles about Torah and Jewish law (halacha), kosher recipes, and the streaming radio feature. The website is frequented very often, and has a high traffic rating on Alexa.

Competition
Yeshiva World News is one of many online news sites, with Vosizneias, Matzav.com and Hamodia as other options for online frum Jewish news.

A 2008 review by Haaretz of what it calls "the Orthodox Internet rally" also grouped Yeshiva World News, Vos Iz Neias, and Matzav.com as having many strengths, but explains that "the ultra-Orthodox community still demands print journalism" because of "reading taking place on the Sabbath, when all electronic devices are turned off and put away."

Contributors
 The advertising and business development is managed and directed by Chaim Chernoff.

Followers

 On Instagram, YWN has over 105,000 followers.
 On Twitter, YWN has over 71,000 followers
 On Facebook, YWN has over 41,000 followers
 On WhatsApp, YWN has 80 groups totaling more than 18,000 users, and it has over 60,000 viewers of its WhatsApp status.

See also
 Vosizneias
 Hamodia

References

External links
 Yeshiva World News website

American news websites
Blogs about Jews and Judaism
Jewish websites
News aggregators